Abraham Doras Shadd (March 2, 1801 – February 11, 1882) was an African-American abolitionist and civil rights activist who emigrated to Ontario, Canada, and became one of Canada's first black elected officials. He was the father of prominent activist and publisher Mary Ann Shadd and her siblings Eunice P. Shadd and Isaac Shadd.

Early life 
Abraham Shadd was born on March 2, 1801, to Jeremiah Schad and Amelia Siscoe. Jeremiah Schad was a son of Hans Schad, alias John Shadd, a native of Hesse-Cassel who had entered the United States serving as a Hessian soldier with the British Army during the French and Indian War. Hans Schad was wounded and left in the care of two African-American women, mother and daughter, both named Elizabeth Jackson. The Hessian soldier and the daughter were married in January 1756 and their first son was born six months later. Sources dispute whether Abraham was born in Pennsylvania and moved to Delaware, or was born in Delaware. Abraham spent most of his early life in Wilmington, Delaware, eventually taking over the shoe-making shop his father Jeremiah had created.

Personal life
Shadd married Harriet Parnell in the early 1820s and together in 1823 had their first of thirteen children, Mary Ann Shadd. She and her siblings would be raised Catholic.

Civil rights and abolitionist movements 
By the 1830s, Abraham Shadd started to become more prominent in the abolitionist movement. He used both his homes in West Chester, Pennsylvania, and Wilmington, Delaware, to provide lodging for fugitive slaves fleeing southern states.  He was a prominent voice in the anti-colonization movement. Shadd was one of five black men at the founding of the Board of Managers of the American Anti-Slavery Society in 1833, as well as a prominent member of the Colored Conventions Movement, serving as a leading delegate in both the 1841 and 1848 black national conventions, both held in Philadelphia.

Life in Canada 
While being a vocal critic of black colonization for most of his life, Abraham Shadd was prompted to move his family north to Canada West (Ontario, Canada) with the passing of the Fugitive Slave Act of 1850. Less than a decade later he would become one of the first black elected officials in Canada, being elected in 1859 to a seat on the Raleigh Township Council. Shadd became a very prominent member of his new Canadian community, creating a school within the Raleigh Township, as well as creating a loan system with his farm tools and equipment, in order to assist other farmers in the community. He also was a member and early trustee of the Prince Hall Masonic Lodge, which assisted former black slaves and freed men in their immigration to Canada West.

Death 
Shadd died on February 11, 1882, a very prominent and well-known man within Canada West and the abolitionist and civil rights movements of the 1800s. His prominence fostered a large funeral ceremony attended at Maple Leaf Cemetery by residents of Kent County, where he would be buried.

Legacy 
In February 2009, Shadd was commemorated with a stamp by Canada Post.

References

External links 

 Chatham-Kent. Shadd, Abraham D. (1801–1882). Chatham-kent.ca. Retrieved November 28, 2018.
 Ito, Gail Arlene. "Shadd, Abraham Doras (1801–1882)". Blackpast.org. Retrieved November 16, 2018.
 African American Registry. "Abraham Shadd, Abolitionist Born". Aaregistry.com. Retrieved November 16, 2018.

1801 births
1882 deaths
People from Wilmington, Delaware
African-American abolitionists
Canadian abolitionists
Black Canadian politicians
Canadian people of German descent
Canadian people of African-American descent
American emigrants to pre-Confederation Ontario
American people of German descent
African-American Catholics
Roman Catholic activists